Dennis Lloyd Martin (born June 20, 1962) was an American child who disappeared on June 14, 1969 in the Great Smoky Mountains National Park in Tennessee at the age of six. The search effort was the most extensive in the park's history, involving approximately 1,400 searchers and a  area.

Disappearance
Dennis Martin, a six-year-old resident of Knoxville, was visiting the Great Smoky Mountains National Park along with his father, grandfather and older brother on Father's Day weekend in 1969. The camping trip was a family tradition for the Martins. The family hiked from Cades Cove to Russell Field and camped overnight. The next day, they hiked to Spence Field near the Appalachian Trail, where they planned to spend the night.

Martin disappeared on June 14 at 16:30 while planning on surprising the adults with his brother and other children from a separate family the Martins were camping with; he was last seen by his father going behind a bush to hide, intending on surprising the adults with the other children. After not seeing him for about five minutes and when all of the other children had returned to the camp site, his father became concerned and began searching for him. His father ran down the trail for nearly two miles, until he was sure he could not have gotten any farther. After several hours, they sought help from National Park Service rangers.

The area where Martin disappeared is marked by steep slopes and ravines. Wild animals such as copperhead snakes, bears, feral hogs, and bobcats inhabit the area. A downpour broke out shortly after Martin's disappearance, dropping  of rain in a matter of hours, which washed out trails and caused streams to flood.

Investigation
Search efforts, including a separate search by the National Guard and Green Berets found no trace. Heavy rains during the first day's search and heavy mist the next day's hampered efforts. Up to 1,400 people were involved in the search effort, potentially obscuring possible clues. Footprints were found in the area, but dismissed as being Martin's and determined by park officials to have been left by a Boy Scout participating in the search. The child-sized footprints led to a stream, where they disappeared. The tracks indicated that one foot was barefoot, while the other was in an Oxford (the type of shoe Martin was wearing) or a tennis shoe. Retired park ranger and author Dwight McCarter believes that the prints likely belonged to Martin, as the tracks were not part of a group and none of the Boy Scouts were searching while barefoot.

A shoe and sock were also found. By June 22,  of ground had been covered. More than a thousand searchers continued to look until June 26, when the search was cut back. The search was abandoned on June 29, after a last search.
The search was officially closed down on September 14, 1969. , it is still the largest search in the history of Great Smoky Mountains National Park.

Aftermath
Dennis's father offered a US$5,000 reward for information. Psychics, including Jeane Dixon, offered clues, but nothing was found. A few years after, a ginseng-hunter claimed to have discovered the scattered skeletal remains of a small child in Big Hollow, Tremont. He kept the find to himself until 1985 because of fear that he would be prosecuted for the illegal ginseng. A subsequent search turned up nothing.

The unsuccessful search for Martin led the National Park Service to review and amend its policies on searches for missing people.

Theories
Three main theories exist about what happened to Martin. 
The first is that he became lost and perished from exposure or some other cause, likely during the first night. This is the most probable theory according to park officials.
The second is that he was attacked by a hungry bear (or, less likely, a feral pig) and carried off. 
The third is that he was abducted and taken out of the park by something or someone. His father was a proponent of the third theory. On the afternoon that Martin disappeared, tourist Harold Key and his family heard an "enormous, sickening scream" and shortly thereafter witnessed an unkempt, rough looking man running up the trail near where the scream had come from. Key looked on as the man got into a white car, and abruptly sped off in it. Park Rangers and the Federal Bureau of Investigation concluded that there was insufficient evidence to link the sighting to Martin's disappearance, particularly given that Key's sighting was approximately five miles away from where Martin disappeared, the exact time of the sighting being unknown, and the lack of trails connecting the two sites.

See also
List of people who disappeared

References

Sources

Further reading

External links 
 
 
 
 
 
 

1960s missing person cases
1969 in Tennessee
Great Smoky Mountains National Park
Incidents of violence against boys
Missing American children
Missing person cases in Tennessee
1962 births
Possibly living people